E-Boy (stylized as eboy) is a 2012 Philippine fantasy science fiction television drama series directed by FM Reyes and Nick Olanka. The series stars Bugoy Cariño in the title role, with an ensemble cast consisting of Andrea Brillantes, Ariel Rivera, Agot Isidro, Jomari Yllana, Maliksi Morales, Deydey Amansec, Arjo Atayde, Akiko Solon, Bryan Santos, Jaime Fabregas, Pen Medina, Chinggoy Alonzo, and Carme Sanchez, with Valerie Concepcion, Crispin Pineda, Tommy Abuel, Gerald Pesigan, Izzy Canillo, Barbie Sabino, Phytos Kyriacou, and Paolo Serrano in their supporting roles. The series premiered on ABS-CBN's Primetime Bida nighttime block from January 30 to April 13, 2012, replacing Ikaw ay Pag-Ibig and was replaced by Princess and I . 

The story revolves around a child robot who was given human characteristics that led him to a journey where he will learn what being human is all about.

Series overview

Overview
See the world through the eyes of a child and embark on a new adventure as ABS-CBN presents its newest Primetime Bida series, "E-Boy", starring MMFF 2011 best child performer Bugoy Carino as the title role.

Follow the heartwarming story of "E-Boy", a child robot who was given human characteristics that led him to a journey where he will learn what being human is all about. Through his real-life experiences, he will realize that being human isn't just about having flesh and blood, but more importantly, it is about being part of a family, building friendships, and loving unconditionally.

Joining Carino in "E-Boy" are seasoned actors Ariel Rivera, Jomari Yllana, Agot Isidro, Valerie Concepcion, Jaime Fabregas, Chinggoy Alonzo, and Pen Medina. It will also star Andrea Brillantes, Arjo Atayde, Carme Sanchez, Akiko Solon, Bryan Santos, and child stars Maliksi Morales and introducing Deydey Amansec.

Cast and characters

Main cast
Bugoy Cariño as E-Boy/Rap-Rap/Alphabot/Megabot - A robotic toy invented by a brilliant man named Gabriel. E-boy has the ability to read and interpret human brain waves. When Gabriel's son died, he transferred all of his child's brainwaves into E-boy. E-boy thus starts taking the personality of the deceased child. He is obedient and very bright. He is also very intuitive and rarely goes against the wishes of his father. He is very loyal and amused by anything that is human. With an intuitive mind and a keen sense of observation, he can also mimic anyone—copying their mannerisms, behaviors, and tendencies.
Andrea Brillantes as Princess - As a street kid, Princess knows the rules of the streets. Although boyish in character, she maintains a positive outlook in life. A believer in dreams and fairytales, she is a reliable and supportive friend who is an excellent negotiator often mediating conflicts. She easily makes friends wherever she goes. Who know that have a crush on E-boy
Ariel Rivera as Gabriel Villareal - The very brilliant inventor behind E-boy. Gabriel grew up with his Mother who died before he has come of age—a reason why he had to go back to his father who nonetheless was a brilliant inventor as well. Gabriel was brought up by his mother to be a positive, caring, and a kind person. He easily sees the goodness in other people and possesses a free and imaginative mind. His attention to detail is also unrivaled. Contrary to what inventors think as science is a set of rigid rules, Gabriel thinks that science is actually like a magical world that needs to be explored.

Supporting Cast 
Agot Isidro as Ria - A smart sophisticated modern woman from a family of doctors, Ria is set to becoming a doctor herself. Everything is set for her until she falls in love with a guy. This is where Ria realizes what is important to her: She is really not about ambition but instead wants to live a simple normal life, with a family that she longs for all her life. Ria is caring and has a very kind spirit. Family is more important to her and she'll do everything for them. She is a strong woman herself especially when it comes to the welfare of her own family.
Jomari Yllana as Miguel Villareal - Miguel is Gabriel's elder half-brother though they have different mothers. Probably because he had such a hard time earning the approval of his father, Miguel is a bit of the rebellious kind unlike Gabriel. Although he may not have the smarts of his brother, Miguel is however, very good strategist. He is charming and many say that he can always talk his way out of things. Miguel is fun, thrilling, and adventurous. But deep inside, he is very sensitive and is actually a jealous person. Though he has learned to love his half brother, he has become the same source of his insecurity. His great ambition for himself is to someday be on top—with the belief that everyone will love him unconditionally by then.
Maliksi Morales as Adrian - Adrian is the eldest son of Gabriel and Ria. An intelligent, industrious child, he is deemed to be the ideal boy every parent would want as a child. Adrian is also a loving sibling to his younger brother, Miyo. In some instances, he will cover up for Miyo's mischievous deeds.
Deydey Amansec as Miyo - Miyo is Gabriel and Ria's youngest child. Despite being a perennial rule breaker, Miyo is more free spirited. Often, this leads to trouble. Sooner or later, he is bound to break a rule—restraining him tempts him all the more. Often reprimanded by his father, Miyo turns to his mother whom he believes understands him more. Miyo believes in real life fairy-tales. He dreams that one day he will embark on his own adventures.
Arjo Atayde as Jepoy - At the age of 18, he has learned to fend for himself. He grew up in a difficult life and without parents to look after him. Although he has a tough life to live, he is still very kind, decent, and very responsible, although a bit Jologs. He values hard work—working by day and studying by night. He only dreams of a normal life with a decent job, earning just enough to live day by day.
Akiko Solon as Ella Dela Cruz - The daughter of Rutherford and Delia who believes that one day she will make it big as a TV Personality in Manila. She is a Barrio lass with big dreams determined and persistent to make her dreams happen. This persistence and perseverance is natural to her. When she gets into the city, she realizes that her world is bigger than her dreams. Because of her uncanny sense of humor, she gets by even in tough situations.
Bryan Santos as Gilbert - Introspective. Rebellious. The “Bad boy” from a well-off family. He is a bit snooty and snobbish at first impression. Sometimes he's thought to be bitter and volatile. But the truth is, he has a vulnerable heart. He is an artist and is actually very sensitive. If there is one thing he dislikes, it is being told what to do.
Jaime Fabregas as Alfredo Villareal - Alberto is the father of both Gabriel and Miguel as well as the grandfather of Adrian (E-Boy) and Miyo. Still struggling to recover from a massive heart attack, Alberto is now but a shell of his former self. He was once a proud inventor known among the scientific community. Unfortunately after a setback from a prestigious award, everything went downhill for him. This is probably the reason why Alberto has never appeared to be a caring father to his children: He expected too much from himself that he also kept setting unrealistic expectations to his kids as well. often getting disappointed. He is often disappointed of his kids, only because he harbors a dream that one day, one of them shall continue his legacy, etching a mark in history by making a significant invention for the world.
Pen Medina as Tatang - He serves as the father figure of Tinay and Jepoy. The streets formed his hardened life—He was once a well-decorated criminal. Now that he's turned his back from his criminal activities, he has become a jack-of-all-trades, engaging in various legitimate rackets. He is strict because he wants to teach those youngsters under him that the world is harsh and unfair. This emanated from a sense of cynicism that formed throughout his years of living. As he says “only the fittest shall survive.” He is very fond of Tinay and the youngsters he adopted treating them like real family.
Chinggoy Alonzo as Jaime Mariano - He is a shrewd and ambitious politician who has a way with words. Perceived to be a reformist and a crusader, Jaime is actually a corrupt and deceiving politician. There is only one interest that is important to him and that is how to cling to power. He is capable of doing very bad things and will stop at nothing to get what he wants. Thus, people around him are careful not to offend him in any way. He knows deception well enough not to easily trust people around him, including his sons.
Carme Sanchez as Delia Dela Cruz - The loving mother of Ella, she is serene and eternally optimistic. She is very capable when it comes to raising her family. She will do everything for them. Very calm, altruistic, and a woman with wisdom. She usually dispenses her advice in a funny and quirky manner in order not to sound preachy.

Extended cast
Valerie Concepcion as Karla Mariano
Crispin Pineda as Rutherford Dela Cruz
Tommy Abuel as Merlito Vergara
Gerald Pesigan as Megabot
Izzy Canillo as Vans
Barbie Sabino as Mae-mae
Phytos Kyriacou as Pugo
Paolo Serrano as Rocky

Special participation
Slater Young as Adult Miyo
Jessy Mendiola as Adult Princess
Martin del Rosario as teen Gabriel
Empress Schuck as teen Ria
Joseph Marco as teen Miguel
Dominic Ochoa as young Alfredo
Jairus Aquino as young Gabriel
Cajo Gomez as young Miguel
Gerald Madrid as young Rutherford
Justin Gonzales as Anthony
Yen Santos as young Karla
Boom Labrusca as young Tatang
Neri Naig as Linda Velasquez
Cherry Lou as Claire Villareal
Phebe Khae Arbortante as Lorraine
Aaron Junatas as Ramboy
Owie Boy Gapuz as Kevin
Brenna Peñaflor as Dianne

Reception

Ratings
According to Kantar Media/TNS ratings, E-boy registered a 28.1% ratings share nationwide beating GMA7's Munting Heredera, which only got 18.8%. The pilot episode premiered victoriously reigning on first place nationwide. The series is currently the most-watched children's television series whilst also battling with two fellow ABS-CBN dramas for primetime supremacy. It is the sixth most-watched television series overall in the month of January, despite only its few days of airing.

See also
List of programs broadcast by ABS-CBN
List of ABS-CBN drama series

References

External links
 
 
 

2012 Philippine television series debuts
2012 Philippine television series endings
ABS-CBN drama series
Filipino-language television shows
Television series by Star Creatives
Television shows set in the Philippines